Polls leading up to the 2000 Canadian federal election.

National polls

Campaign period

During the 34th Parliament of Canada

By geographic area

In the Atlantic provinces

In Québec

In Ontario

In the Prairies

In Alberta

In British Columbia

Notes

References

External links
http://www.canadawebpages.com/pc-polls.asp

2000 Canadian federal election
2000 general election
Canada